Artem Andriyovych Fedetskyi (born 26 April 1985) is a Ukrainian football right defender.

Biography 
He graduated from the Lutsk Institute of Human Development "Vlad Pushkar" with a degree in "Marketing". Candidate of Pedagogical Sciences. In 2018 he defended his dissertation on the specialty. A pupil of Lutsk football. In the children's and youth football league of Ukraine he played for Volyn and Shakhtar Donetsk.

Career
In the 2008–09 season, he played for FC Shakhtar Donetsk, having come to Shakhtar in the 2008 summer transfer season from FC Kharkiv.

Political career
Fedetskyi will take part in the July 2019 Ukrainian parliamentary election in electoral district 118, Lviv Oblast, for the party Servant of the People.

International

International goals 
Scores and results list Ukraine's goal tally first.

Honors 
After playing a home match on Sunday, 17 August 2008, against rivals Metalist Kharkiv which Shaktar tied 2:2, Fedetskiy was named by UA-Football as the best right midfielder of the fifth round in the Ukrainian Premier League. He also scored one goal against Galatasaray SK and after that goal Karpaty reached UEFA Europe League Group Stage.

FC Shakhtar Donetsk
 UEFA Cup: 2009

FC Dnipro Dnipropetrovsk
UEFA Europa League (1): runner-up 2014–15

Personal life 
His father Andriy Fedetskyi also was a football player.

References

External links
 
 

1985 births
Living people
People from Novovolynsk
Ukrainian footballers
Ukrainian Premier League players
Ukrainian First League players
Ukrainian Second League players
Ukrainian Amateur Football Championship players
Bundesliga players
FC Arsenal Kyiv players
FC Karpaty Lviv players
FC Shakhtar Donetsk players
FC Shakhtar-2 Donetsk players
FC Shakhtar-3 Donetsk players
FC Kharkiv players
FC Dnipro players
SV Darmstadt 98 players
Ukraine international footballers
UEFA Euro 2016 players
Ukrainian expatriate footballers
Expatriate footballers in Germany
Ukrainian expatriate sportspeople in Germany
Association football fullbacks
Servant of the People (political party) politicians
Presidents of Ukraine